Mountbatten-Windsor is the personal surname used by some of the male-line descendants of Queen Elizabeth II and Prince Philip, Duke of Edinburgh. Under a declaration made in Privy Council in 1960, the name Mountbatten-Windsor applies to male-line descendants of Queen Elizabeth II without royal styles and titles. Individuals with royal styles do not usually use a surname, but some descendants of the Queen with royal styles have used Mountbatten-Windsor when a surname was required.

Current use
The British monarchy asserts that the name Mountbatten-Windsor is used by members of the royal family who do not have a surname, when a surname is required. For example, Prince Andrew, Duke of York, and Anne, Princess Royal, children of Queen Elizabeth II, used the surname Mountbatten-Windsor in official marriage registry entries in 1986 and 1973 respectively. Likewise, William, Duke of Cambridge, used the name when filing a French lawsuit related to the topless pictures of his wife published by the French magazine Closer.

At the time of the 1960 declaration, palace officials claimed in private communications that it created a hidden surname that would emerge several generations later when some of Queen Elizabeth II's descendants were further removed from the throne. On the wedding of Prince Edward and Sophie Rhys-Jones in 1999, the Queen decided, with their agreement, that any of their future children should not be styled His or Her Royal Highness. Consequently, the birth of their daughter in 2003 marked the first emergence of the Mountbatten-Windsor surname. Their daughter was named Louise Alice Elizabeth Mary Mountbatten-Windsor, and she goes by the title of Lady Louise Mountbatten-Windsor, her father being the Duke of Edinburgh.

Mountbatten-Windsor differs from the official name of the British royal family, which remains the House of Windsor. In accordance with law and custom in the English-speaking world, the surname Mountbatten-Windsor belongs to all male-line descendants of Queen Elizabeth II and Prince Philip, and is used by them if and when a surname is needed. In contrast, male-line descendants of King George V, the first monarch of the House of Windsor, use Windsor as their surname if and when a surname is needed, as for example Lady Davina Windsor and Lady Marina Windsor, respectively descended from George V's sons Prince George, Duke of Kent and Prince Henry, Duke of Gloucester. (George V's other sons have no male-line descendants: King George VI had only daughters while King Edward VIII had no issue and Prince John was unmarried.)  After the House of Saxe-Coburg and Gotha was renamed Windsor, other descendants of Queen Victoria and Prince Albert could also use the name Windsor, as for example, Alastair Arthur Windsor, 2nd Duke of Connaught and Strathearn, grandson of their son Prince Arthur, Duke of Connaught and Strathearn. None do so today, however, because the only male line (apart from the descendants of King George V) is through Charles Edward, Duke of Saxe-Coburg and Gotha, whose descendants use the surname Saxe-Coburg and Gotha (English) or von Sachsen-Coburg und Gotha (German).

Male-line descendants of Elizabeth II and Philip
The family tree is based on the current line of succession to the British throne, excluding female-line descendants.

  Queen Elizabeth II (1926–2022) ∞  Prince Philip, Duke of Edinburgh (1921–2021) – m. 1947
  King Charles III (b. 1948)
(1)  William, Prince of Wales (b. 1982)
(2)  Prince George of Wales (b. 2013)
(3)  Princess Charlotte of Wales (b. 2015)
(4)  Prince Louis of Wales (b. 2018)
(5)  Prince Harry, Duke of Sussex (b. 1984)
(6)  Prince Archie of Sussex (b. 2019)
(7)  Princess Lilibet of Sussex (b. 2021)
(8)  Prince Andrew, Duke of York (b. 1960) 
(9)  Princess Beatrice, Mrs Edoardo Mapelli Mozzi (b. 1988)
(11)  Princess Eugenie, Mrs Jack Brooksbank (b. 1990)
(13)  Prince Edward, Duke of Edinburgh (b. 1964)
(14)  James Mountbatten-Windsor, Earl of Wessex (b. 2007)
(15)  Lady Louise Mountbatten-Windsor (b. 2003)
(16)  Anne, Princess Royal (b. 1950)

Marriages

See also
 House of Windsor – Queen Elizabeth II's paternal family house
 House of Bowes-Lyon – Queen Elizabeth II's maternal family house
 House of Glücksburg – Prince Philip's paternal family house
 House of Mountbatten – Prince Philip's maternal family house

References

External links
 1960 Declaration

 
Surnames of European origin